Olivier Sarraméa (born October 20, 1975) is a French rugby union player.

Olivier Sarramea began playing Rugby Union with Castres Olympique where he was runners up of the European Challenge Cup. In 2004 he moved to play with Stade Français. He earned his first cap for the France national team on June 3, 1999 against the Romania. In the same year he played his last test for France against New Zealand on June 26. He was selected for the 1999 Rugby World Cup but didn't play any test.

References

External links

ERC statistics 

French rugby union players
France international rugby union players
1975 births
Living people
Sportspeople from Tarbes
Rugby union centres
Rugby union wings
Castres Olympique players
Stade Français players
Montpellier Hérault Rugby players
SU Agen Lot-et-Garonne players